Judah Reuben (21 January 1922 – 13 November 2006) was an Indian cricket umpire.

Reuben began umpiring first-class cricket in 1960, and made his Test debut in 1969. He umpired ten Test matches between 1969 and 1977.

Reuben worked as a fingerprint expert with the Bombay police. He died after a fall at home in 2006.

References

1922 births
2006 deaths
People from Mumbai
Indian Test cricket umpires